Kevin Sundher (born January 18, 1992) is a former Canadian professional ice hockey forward who played in the American Hockey League (AHL) and the Czech Extraliga. Sundher was drafted by the Buffalo Sabres in the third round of the 2010 NHL Entry Draft.

Playing career
On December 15, 2011, Sundher was signed to a three-year entry-level contract with the Buffalo Sabres. He was assigned to their AHL affiliate, the Rochester Americans for the duration of his contract.

As a free agent and with little NHL interest, Sundher opted to sign a one-year contract in the ECHL with the Reading Royals on September 22, 2015. His season was ultimately shortened by a leg injury he suffered while playing for the AHL's Lehigh Valley Phantoms on a professional tryout. He signed an AHL contract with the Phantoms on August 16, 2016, but spent most of the season in Reading before being released from his contract so he could sign for the remainder of the season with HC Olomouc of the Czech Extraliga.

Sundher signed an extension to remain with HC Olomouc for the 2017–18 season. He again made a midseason team change, being released by HC Olomouc and signing with the Sparta Warriors of the Norwegian GET-ligaen on January 15, 2018. In the off-season he opted to return to North America by signing a contract with the ECHL's Allen Americans for the 2018–19 season.

Career statistics

References

External links

1992 births
Living people
Allen Americans players
Brandon Wheat Kings players
Buffalo Sabres draft picks
Canadian ice hockey centres
Chilliwack Bruins players
Elmira Jackals (ECHL) players
HC Olomouc players
Lehigh Valley Phantoms players
Reading Royals players
Rochester Americans players
Sparta Warriors players
Sportspeople from Surrey, British Columbia
Victoria Royals players
Ice hockey people from British Columbia
Canadian expatriate ice hockey players in the United States
Canadian expatriate ice hockey players in the Czech Republic
Canadian expatriate ice hockey players in Norway